José Manuel Arnaiz Díaz (born 15 April 1995) is a Spanish professional footballer who plays as a left winger for CD Leganés.

Club career

Valladolid
Arnaiz was born in Talavera de la Reina, Toledo, Castile-La Mancha. He made his senior debut with UD Talavera in 2013 in Tercera División at the age of 18 and, on 6 May 2013, moved to Real Valladolid in a return to youth football.

On 7 November 2015, after appearing regularly with the reserves, Arnaiz made his professional debut by coming on as a late substitute for Pedro Tiba in a 1–1 home draw against CD Leganés in the Segunda División. The following 8 June, after scoring 11 goals the previous season, he renewed his contract until 2019, and was definitely promoted to the first team.

Arnaiz scored his first professional goal on 21 August 2016, the only in a home victory over Real Oviedo. On 8 October, he scored a brace in a 2–0 home defeat of AD Alcorcón, and finished the campaign with 12 goals, being a key unit as his side failed to qualify for the play-offs.

Barcelona
On 25 August 2017, FC Barcelona reached an agreement with Valladolid for the transfer of Arnaiz. He signed a three-year contract with the club three days later, being initially assigned to their B side also in the second division.

Arnaiz made his first-team debut on 24 October 2017, starting the match and scoring the last goal in a 3–0 away win over Real Murcia in the round of 32 of the Copa del Rey. The following 3 January, he opened the 1–1 away draw against RC Celta de Vigo also in the national cup; he went on score three times during that competition, only needing as many shots to achieve the feat.

Arnaiz's maiden La Liga appearance took place on 7 January 2018, when he replaced Sergi Roberto late in a 3–0 home victory against Levante UD.

Leganés
On 13 August 2018, Arnaiz agreed to a five-year contract with CD Leganés. On 29 January 2020, he was loaned to fellow top-tier side CA Osasuna until June. On 11 July, he scored the winner as the hosts defeated Celta 2–1, and in another win by the same score he added another goal at Barcelona's Camp Nou five days later.

Career statistics

Club

Honours
Barcelona
La Liga: 2017–18
Copa del Rey: 2017–18

References

External links
FC Barcelona official profile

1995 births
Living people
People from Talavera de la Reina
Sportspeople from the Province of Toledo
Spanish footballers
Footballers from Castile and León
Association football wingers
La Liga players
Segunda División players
Segunda División B players
Tercera División players
Real Valladolid Promesas players
Real Valladolid players
FC Barcelona Atlètic players
FC Barcelona players	
CD Leganés players
CA Osasuna players